The Timor friarbird or plain friarbird (Philemon inornatus) is a species of bird in the family Meliphagidae.
It is found on Timor island.
Its natural habitat is subtropical or tropical dry forests.

References

Timor friarbird
Birds of Timor
Timor friarbird
Taxonomy articles created by Polbot